Arborio is a comune (municipality) in the Province of Vercelli in the Italian region Piedmont, located about  northeast of Turin and about  north of Vercelli.

Arborio borders the following municipalities: Ghislarengo, Greggio, Landiona, Recetto, Rovasenda, San Giacomo Vercellese, Sillavengo, Vicolungo, and Villarboit.

References

Cities and towns in Piedmont
Articles which contain graphical timelines